Jahan may refer to:

 Pierre Jahan (1909–2003), French photographer 
 Shah Jahan, fifth Mughal emperor, reigned from 1628 to 1658
 Jahan Dotson (born 2000), American football player

See also
 Ishrat Jahan case (1985–2004), shooting and criminal case in the Gujarat state of India
 Jahan Nama (disambiguation), several places in Iran